The Light Rail Transit Line 6 is a proposed rapid transit system in Cavite, Philippines. There have been two proposals for the line, with the first one shelved immediately in 2018. Another proposal emerged in 2017 and is currently under review by the National Economic and Development Authority (NEDA).

Background and history
The province of Cavite is known as a "bedroom community" for those who work in Metro Manila. Over the recent decades, urbanization has been widespread in the country and urban sprawl has been most evident within the Greater Manila Area. The LRT Line 6 aims to provide rail transport options to 45 percent of Cavite's population which are concentrated on the cities of Bacoor, Imus and Dasmariñas.

Early trains in Cavite

Trains belonging to the Manila Railroad Company previously plied the Naic line from Paco station in Manila to Naic station in Naic, Cavite. The commuter rail line was opened in 1909 by the virtue of Insular Government Act No. 1905. There was also a branch line to Cavite City which would have branched off at Noveleta. Some of these trains passed by once towns of Parañaque and Las Piñas in Manila, as well as Bacoor in Cavite. The line ended operation by 1936 and much of the line has been built over in the following decades, such as the expansion of the Nichols Field. Some of the historical right-of-way is now shared between the Colonel Jesus Villamor Air Base and Ninoy Aquino International Airport.

LRT Line 1 Cavite extension

There were no plans to rebuild a line to Cavite until 2004 when Canadian firm SNC-Lavalin proposed an extension of the existing Line 1 to Cavite. However, the Arroyo administration rejected the study in 2005. In 2012, the LRT Line 1 south extension project as a public-private partnership project. It aims to extend the line to Bacoor, Cavite with a target start of construction in 2014 and opening date in mid-2015. However, the bidding process failed and the government repeatedly postponed the project starting in 2013. It was not until 2019 when construction for the LRT Line 1 extension commenced and is currently 61.60% complete as of December 2021. The line in its current form has a targeted partial opening date by 2024 and will be fully-operational by 2027.

First Line 6 proposal
The first mention of a separate LRT Line 6 in Cavite was when then-president Benigno Aquino III approved the construction of the LRT Line 6 in Cavite after a National Economic and Development Authority board meeting on September 6, 2015. The first proposal was described as a  commuter rail line along the route of the Aguinaldo Highway. It will start from Niog station, which is separate from the Line 1 station and the two lines will not share tracks. The next stations will be Tirona, Imus, and Daang Hari stations in Imus; and Salitran, Congressional Avenue, and Governor's Drive in Dasmariñas. This project however was shelved indefinitely in 2018.

Modified Line 6A and 6B+C proposal
In 2018, Villar-led Prime Asset Ventures Inc. came up with an alternative proposal for the said railway line. The new mainline consists of 23.5 km (14.6 mi) long, nine (9) stations, passing through the less congested arterial road of Molino–Paliparan Road, including the large-scale vacant properties in Bacoor and Dasmariñas, Cavite. The new proposal will branch out its railway network in Las Piñas, Muntinlupa, and Parañaque where large-scale subdivisions are situated. As of December 2020, the proposal has passed the stringent qualifications set by the Department of Environment and Natural Resources, prompting to issue an Environmental Compliance Certificate (ECC) on February 7, 2020. The project is now under review by the NEDA-ICC alongside other unsolicited proposals such as the Metro Manila SkyTrain and the MRT Line 10.

Proposed stations
The main line is so-called Modified Line 6, formerly called Line 6A.

Three stations have been named after locations outside the line's actual right of way: San Pedro, Alabang and GMA. San Pedro being named after the city of San Pedro, Laguna, Alabang after the eponymous barangay in Muntinlupa, and GMA station after the town of General Mariano Alvarez, Cavite. It was however stated in the unsolicited proposal that Alabang Line 6 station is actually located in Barangay Molino IV in Bacoor, while San Pedro will be located in Salawag and GMA in Paliparan IV, both are barangays of Dasmariñas.

Expansion
Both the Filipino proponents and the Japanese consultants also included their proposed expanded network to their documents. It includes Line 6B, an airport rail link extension of Line 6 to Ninoy Aquino International Airport; Line 6C, a spur line near the Parañaque–Muntinlupa border; Line 6D, another spur line to Alabang, near the Alabang station of the Philippine National Railways; and the Line 6 extension to Tagaytay. Line 6D is also being developed by the Japanese firm as a separate line. According to the 2020 Japanese study, the expansion is set to be completed by 2040.

Line 6B
Line 6B will run between Ninoy Aquino International Airport in Pasay and San Nicolas Line 6A station in Bacoor, Cavite.

Line 6C
Line 6C will run along the right-of-way of Dr. Santos Avenue in Parañaque. A  6-station spur of Line 6B, it will split with Line 6B between Canaynay and El Grande stations. While a majority of the area would not have a right-of-way issue for an elevated railway, a two-way ramp leading to the Sucat exit of the Metro Manila Skyway will cause a section of the line leading to Lake Front station to be built as an underpass.

Line 6D
Line 6D is connected to Line 6B at Marcos–Alvarez station in Las Piñas. It will be  with 4 stations along the Alabang–Zapote Road in Las Piñas and Muntinlupa. This line will have a targeted opening date by 2030.

This branch in particular is also the subject of the Japanese feasibility study published by METI in 2020. Line 6D's Starmall station is located on a vacant lot beside Alabang exit of the South Luzon Expressway. The study also proposed a footbridge connection to the future Alabang station of the North–South Commuter Railway. It is also proposed to be converted into a separate line in the future named the Alabang–Zapote Line. Once this extension is approved, the Alabang–Zapote Line will reach the Cavite Economic Zone in Rosario, Cavite. The expansion is targeted to be completed by 2040.

Technical

Rolling stock
The line will use electric multiple units that will be powered through overhead lines, but the type of the rolling stock used remains unspecified. In the 2015 study, Line 6 trains will use  electrification, similar to LRT Line 1 as well as some light rail and light rapid transit systems used overseas. The trainsets will also be arranged into a four-car formation reflective of newer-generation light rail vehicles (LRVs) used on Line 1. The use of the term "commuter rail" for the rolling stock made it ambiguous as to whether or not the line will use LRVs or high-capacity trainsets.

In the 2019 proposal, it is also left unspecified as to use LRVs or rapid transit trainsets. An automated guideway transit was also given as an option for Line 6D in the 2020 Japanese study presented by METI. The 2020 study also recommended the use of 4-car trainsets as with the 2015 proposal. The 2020 study also made allowances for coupling two trains into 8-car sets. The maximum passenger capacity of the trainsets is at 300 per car or 1,200 people per set. In comparison, the LRTA 13000 class has a maximum capacity of 1,388 passengers. The use of the AGT, light rail vehicles, or heavy rail trainsets is currently under assessment by NEDA.

Station design
The 2020 study recommends that the line will use island platforms due to its compact size and costs less to construct. The design for the elevated stations will be based on the Yurikamome automated guideway transit system in Tokyo. All elevated stations will feature eki-naka (ja) commercial development. Three stations would be grade-separated by embankment instead of being fully-elevated stations through a viaduct. These are San Nicolas, Daang Hari, and Alabang stations. This is because these stations will be built over private property. Lake Front station of Line 6C will also be built partially underground due to the conflicting pillars of the Metro Manila Skyway Sucat exit ramp. Other than these four stations, the line shall be built with a viaduct.

Line 6 system length

Notes

References

Line 6
Proposed public transportation in the Philippines
Light Rail Transit System Line 6
Transportation in Cavite
Light Rail Transit System Line 6
Transportation in Luzon